The Siege of Tbilisi (1226) was a successful siege by Jalal al-Din Mangburni.

Jalal al-Din Mangburni had a great victory in the Battle of Garni. He went on an expedition to Georgia again in 1226. Sultan asked the Georgian general Shalva of Akhaltsikhe where to go but Shalva wanted to lure the sultan into an ambush. The Sultan noticed this and killed Shalva. The Sultan gathered 10,000 men against the Georgian army, who wanted to ambush him and inflicted a heavy defeat on them at the Battle of Bendi Pembe. Then Jalal al-Din headed to Tbilisi. At this time, the Georgian Queen Rusudan left Tbilisi. Jalal al-Din Mangburni wanted to drive the Georgians out of the castle and for this he sent 3,000 men from the front. The Georgians thought that the Sultan had too few men and left the fortress and attacked him but this was a trap. Jalal al-Din immediately sent 7,000 of his men behind the Georgians and he surrounded and destroyed the Georgians. This time the Sultan attacked Tbilisi and he captured the city and he made a great massacre in the city.

References

Works cited 

Tbilsi (1226)
Battles of the Middle Ages
1226 in Asia
1226 in Europe
13th century in the Kingdom of Georgia
Battles involving the Khwarazmian dynasty